The B method is a method of software development based on B, a tool-supported formal method based on an abstract machine notation, used in the development of computer software.

Overview
B was originally developed in the 1980s by Jean-Raymond Abrial in France and the UK. B is related to the Z notation (also originated by Abrial) and supports development of programming language code from specifications. B has been used in major safety-critical system applications in Europe (such as the automatic Paris Métro lines 14 and 1 and the Ariane 5 rocket). It has robust, commercially available tool support for specification, design, proof and code generation.

Compared to Z, B is slightly more low-level and more focused on refinement to code rather than just formal specification — hence it is easier to correctly implement a specification written in B than one in Z. In particular, there is good tool support for this.
The same language is used in specification, design and programming.
Mechanisms include encapsulation and data locality.

Event-B
Subsequently, another formal method called Event-B has been developed based on the B-Method, support by the Rodin Platform. Event-B is a formal method aimed at system-level modelling and analysis. Features of Event-B are the use of set theory for modelling, the use of refinement to represent systems at different levels of abstraction, and the use of mathematical proof for verifying consistency between these refinement levels.

The main components
The B notation depends on set theory and first order logic in order to specify different versions of software that covers the complete cycle of project development.

Abstract machine
In the first and the most abstract version, which is called Abstract Machine, the designer should specify the goal of the design.

Refinement
 Then, during a refinement step, they may pad the specification in order to clarify the goal or to turn the abstract machine more concrete by adding details about data structures and algorithms that define, how the goal is achieved. 
 The new version, which is called Refinement, should be proven to be coherent and including all the properties of the abstract machine.
 The designer may make use of B libraries in order to model data structures or to include or import existing components.

Implementation
 The refinement continues until a deterministic version is achieved: the Implementation.
 During all of the development steps the same notation is used and the last version may be translated to a programming language for compilation.

Software

B-Toolkit
The B-Toolkit is a collection of programming tools designed to support the use of the B-Tool, is a set theory-based mathematical interpreter, for the purposes of supporting the B-Method. Development was originally undertaken by Ib Holm Sørensen and others, at BP Research and then at B-Core (UK) Limited. 

The toolkit uses a custom X Window Motif Interface for GUI management and runs primarily on the Linux, Mac OS X and Solaris operating systems.

The B-Toolkit source code is now available.

Atelier B
Developed by ClearSy, Atelier B is an industrial tool that allows for the operational use of the B Method to develop defect-free proven software (formal software). Two versions are available: 1) Community Edition available to anyone without any restriction; 2) Maintenance Edition for maintenance contract holders only. Atelier B has been used to develop safety automatisms for the various subways installed throughout the world by Alstom and Siemens, and also for Common Criteria certification and the development of system models by ATMEL and STMicroelectronics.

Rodin

The Rodin Platform is a tool that supports Event-B. Rodin is based on an Eclipse software IDE (integrated development environment) and provides support for refinement and mathematical proof. The platform is open source and forms part of the Eclipse framework It is extendable using software component plug-ins. The development of Rodin has been supported by the European Union projects DEPLOY (2008–2012), RODIN (2004–2007), and ADVANCE (2011–2014).

BHDL
BHDL provides a method for the correct design of digital circuits, combining
the advantages of the hardware description language VHDL with the formality of B.

APCB
APCB (Association de Pilotage des Conférences B, in English the International B Conference Steering Committee) has organized meetings associated with the B-Method. It has organized ZB conferences with the Z User Group and ABZ conferences, including Abstract State Machines (ASM) as well as the Z notation.

Books
The B-Book: Assigning Programs to Meanings, Jean-Raymond Abrial, Cambridge University Press, 1996. .
The B-Method: An Introduction, Steve Schneider, Palgrave Macmillan, Cornerstones of Computing series, 2001. .
Software Engineering with B, John Wordsworth, Addison Wesley Longman, 1996. .
The B Language and Method: A Guide to Practical Formal Development, Kevin Lano, Springer-Verlag, FACIT series, 1996. .
Specification in B: An Introduction using the B Toolkit, Kevin Lano, World Scientific Publishing Company, Imperial College Press, 1996. .
Modeling in Event-B: System and Software Engineering, Jean-Raymond Abrial, Cambridge University Press, 2010. .

Conferences
The following conferences have explicitly included the B-Method and/or Event-B:

Z2B Conference, Nantes, France, 10–12 October 1995 
First B Conference, Nantes, France, 25–27 November 1996
Second B Conference, Montpellier, France, 22–24 April 1998 
ZB 2000, York, United Kingdom, 28 August – 2 September 2000
ZB 2002, Grenoble, France, 23–25 January 2002
ZB 2003, Turku, Finland, 4–6 June 2003
ZB 2005, Guildford, United Kingdom, 2005
B 2007, Besançon, France, 2007
B, from research to teaching, Nantes, France, 16 June 2008
B, from research to teaching, Nantes, France, 8 June 2009
B, from research to teaching, Nantes, France, 7 June 2010
ABZ 2008, British Computer Society, London, United Kingdom, 16–18 September 2008 
ABZ 2010, Orford, Québec, Canada, 23–25 February 2010
ABZ 2012, Pisa, Italy, 18–22 June 2012
ABZ 2014, Toulouse, France, 2–6 June 2014
ABZ 2016, Linz, Austria, 23–27 May 2016
ABZ 2018, Southampton, United Kingdom, 2018
ABZ 2020, Ulm, Germany, 2021 (delayed due to the COVID-19 pandemic)
ABZ 2021, Ulm, Germany, 2021

See also
 Formal methods
 Z notation

References

External links
B Method.com – work and subjects concerning the B method, a formal method with proof
Atelier B.eu : Atelier B is a systems engineering workshop, which enables software to be developed that is guaranteed to be flawless
Site B Grenoble

Formal methods
Formal methods tools
Formal specification languages